Daerpies Dierie is a Southern Sami church quarterly, founded in 1997 and headquartered in Snåsa, Norway. The magazine is financially supported by the Diocese of Härnösand in Sweden and the Diocese of Nidaros in Norway. The magazine's editor-in-chief and founder is Bierna Bientie. Articles are published in Swedish, Norwegian or Southern Sami. The articles cover a wide range of topics, from Sami church life to more general news about the Sami community.

References

1997 establishments in Norway
Christian magazines
Magazines established in 1997
Magazines published in Norway
Sámi magazines
Sámi church life
Southern Sámi
Quarterly magazines published in Norway